Lee "Stubby" Gordon (born Lavern Elton Gordon; May 12, 1902 – October 3, 1946) was an American musician and bandleader who conducted the Rhythm Masters orchestra and wrote the music for songs such as "Tell Me Dreamy Eyes", "Worryin' Blues", and "Rippin' It Off."

Career 
One of the most renowned saxophonists, he joined Phil Spitalny's orchestra and was soon promoted to director. He later became music director of WTAM and conductor of the NBC Orchestra. Gordon was the first to broadcast Franklin D. Roosevelt Jr.'s song, "The Rest of My Life With You".

Personal life 
Lavern Elton Gordon was born in Warren, Pennsylvania, on May 12, 1902 and died in Cleveland, Ohio, on October 3, 1946, aged 44. He was interred in the family plot in Oakland Cemetery, Warren.

References

External links
Digitized Pine Ridge News Vol I, No I
Sheldon Harris Sheet Music Finding-Aid at the University of Mississippi (originals)

1902 births
1946 deaths
American saxophonists
American male saxophonists
Big band bandleaders
Musicians from Cleveland
Jazz musicians from Pennsylvania
People from Warren, Pennsylvania
20th-century American saxophonists
Jazz musicians from Ohio
20th-century American male musicians
American male jazz musicians